St. Nino Church of Alibeglo is a Georgian Orthodox Church located in Qakh District, northwestern Azerbaijan, on the border with Georgia. The last time it was renovated by the local community was in the period of the reintroduction of Christianity in Hereti (Saingilo), between 1850-1855. The church is of kuppelhalle (domed rectangle) type with a projecting apse and an elongated west arm. The church has a bell-tower to its west.

See also
Kurmukhi Church
St George's Church, Qakh

Sources 
 
 Managing the Tigris and Euphrates Watershed
 Bibliography on Water Resources and International Law

References

Eastern Orthodox churches in Azerbaijan